Kyogle conicicornis is a weevil in the Staphylinidae family, native to Tasmania.

It was first described by Arthur Mills Lea in 1911 as Euplectops conicicornis, from specimen(s) collected in Tasmania.

References

External links
Kyogle conicicornis images & occurrence data from GBIF

Kyogle conicicornis
Fauna of Tasmania
Taxa named by Arthur Mills Lea
Beetles described in 1911